Kudian (also Romanized as Kūdīān and Kūdeyān; also known as Kordīān and Kordīyān) is a village in Derak Rural District, in the Central District of Shiraz County, Fars Province, Iran. At the 2006 census, its population was 1,051, in 207 families.

References 

Populated places in Shiraz County